Gábor Téglás (March 23, 1848–February 4, 1916) was a Hungarian archaeologist.

Born in Brassó (Brașov), in the Principality of Transylvania, he attended primary and secondary school in his native city. Téglás then studied law at the Royal University of Pest. Returning to Transylvania in 1871, he became a teacher at the state high school in Déva.

After settling in Déva, Téglás began to undertake archaeological research in the surrounding Hunyad County. Meanwhile, he set up the high school's annual journal, where his first research appeared. In 1888, he was elected a corresponding member of the Hungarian Academy of Sciences. The same year, he became director of the high school, serving until 1904.

At that point, he left for Budapest, leading a withdrawn existence in his house while continuing to publish. His research focused on prehistory and Roman Dacia in southwest Transylvania.

Notes

References
Erwin Gáll, “Precursorii arheologiei profesioniste din Transilvania: biografia lui Gábor Téglás (1848-1916)”, in Alexandru Barnea (ed.), Arheologia Clasică în România, pp. 141–69. Cluj-Napoca: Editura Nereamia Napocae, 2003, ISBN 973-7951-11-5

1848 births
1916 deaths
People from Brașov
Eötvös Loránd University alumni
Members of the Hungarian Academy of Sciences
Historiography of Dacia
Hungarian archaeologists
Heads of schools in Hungary
Hungarian schoolteachers

hu:Téglás Gábor (régész)